Nanton-Claresholm was a provincial electoral district in Alberta, Canada, mandated to return a single member to the Legislative Assembly of Alberta from 1909 to 1926.

History
The Nanton-Claresholm electoral district was formed in 1930 from the Nanton and Claresholm electoral districts.

The electoral district was named for the Town of Nanton and Town of Claresholm.

Gordon Beverly Walker the United Farmers of Alberta candidate would win the first of two elections held in Nanton-Claresholm, Walker had previously served as the Member of the Legislative Assembly of Alberta for the Claresholm district from 1926, and prior to the redistribution and formation of Nanton-Claresholm.

The Nanton-Claresholm electoral district was abolished prior to the 1940 Alberta general election to form the Macleod, Okotoks-High River and Little Bow electoral districts.

Harry O. Haslam, the Alberta Social Credit candidate would defeat Walker during the final of the two elections held in Nanton-Claresholm in 1935.

Election results

1930 general election

1935 general election

See also
List of Alberta provincial electoral districts
Nanton, Alberta, a town in southwest Alberta
Claresholm, Alberta, a town in southwest Alberta

References

Further reading

External links
Elections Alberta
The Legislative Assembly of Alberta

Former provincial electoral districts of Alberta